Doris Lucy Eleanor Bloomfield Boyd (20 November 1888 – 13 June 1960) was an Australian artist, painter and ceramicist.

Early life 
Doris Boyd was the youngest of six children, born to Victorian Naval Forces Lieutenant Thomas Bunbury Gough and Evelyn Anna Walker Gough (née Rigg).Doris grew up in an unusual household, in which her mother's buoyant spirit, radical politics and Christian Science faith contrasted with her father's conservative background and temperament. Her family line ran directly back to Thomas Bunbury Gough, a Dean of Derry, brother to the great soldier Hugh Gough, the 1st Viscount Gough.  Bunbury Gough was a Lieutenant in the Victorian Navy between 1885 and 1888, a high rank at the time.  As Lieutenant, he was in charge of running the  when the Commander was not on board. Outside of his naval career in Victoria, he worked variously as a merchant, as an insurance agent, and as a commission agent, as did his father-in-law.  Evelyn was co-proprietor of The Sun: A Society Courier.

Doris Gough studied under Bernard Hall and Frederick McCubbin at the National Gallery School where she met Merric Boyd, a fellow student and potter.  Boyd came from a background of artists who collectively formed the Boyd family.

In 1915, she married Boyd, and together they raised five children: Lucy, Arthur (painter, ceramics), Guy (pottery, sculpture), David (pottery, painting) and Mary.

Career
Doris decorated many of Merric Boyd's works between 1920 and 1930.  These were mostly pieces for domestic use, featuring Australian flora and fauna. Boyd's Murrumbeena studio and his pottery were destroyed by fire in 1926.

With a strong faith in Christian Science, Doris influenced her husband, an epileptic, to convert in his latter years. She died on 13 June 1960, nine months after Merric. They are buried side by side at Brighton General Cemetery, Caulfield South, Victoria, Australia.

References 

1889 births
1960 deaths
Australian women painters
20th-century Australian painters
20th-century Australian women artists
Doris
Burials in Victoria (Australia)
National Gallery of Victoria Art School alumni